Isabeau is a leggenda drammatica or opera in three parts by Pietro Mascagni, 1911, from an Italian libretto by Luigi Illica. Mascagni conducted its first performance on 2 June 1911 at the Teatro Coliseo, Buenos Aires.

A retelling of the medieval English legend of Lady Godiva, Mascagni described it in an interview as his attempt to "return to the romanticism which inspired so much of Italian opera."

Roles

Synopsis
King Raimondo tries to find a husband for the princess Isabeau by holding a tournament, but she is unwilling to choose a husband. When the king forces her to ride naked through the city, the people refuse to look at her out of respect. Furthermore, they demand from the king an edict condemning to blindness anyone who dares to look at her. Unaware of the edict, the falconer Folco accidentally looks upon Isabeau during her ride and is arrested. When Isabeau visits him in prison, she falls in love with him and begs her father to pardon him. However, the king's minister stirs up the passions of the people who rise up in a vigilante mob and kill Folco. Isabeau kills herself over his dying body.

Recordings

References 

 

Italian-language operas
Operas by Pietro Mascagni
Operas
1911 operas
Operas based on myths and legends
Lady Godiva